Who Do You Think You Are? is an Australian television sitcom which first screened on the ABC in 1976.

Who Do You Think You Are? follows the story of a young woman Kelly, who is recently separated from her husband Tony and is living with flatmate Tom.

Cast
 Barbara Stephens as Kelly
 Tony Llewellyn-Jones as Tom
 Stephen O'Rourke as Tony
 John Ewart
 Susanne Haworth as Marcia
 Maggie Kirkpatrick

See also
 List of Australian television series

References

External links
 
 Who Do You Think You Are? at Classic Television Australia

1976 Australian television series debuts
1976 Australian television series endings
Australian television sitcoms
Australian Broadcasting Corporation original programming
English-language television shows